IMCI may refer to:

 International Marine Certification Institute, a certification organisation to serve the interests of the recreational boating industry
 Integrated Management of Childhood Illness, an approach to children's health which focuses on the whole child
 Initial Many Core Instructions, a processor instruction extension for Intel's 64-bit architecture based on SIMD instructions